After the Ball may refer to:

Books and plays
After the Ball: Pop Music from Rag to Rock, a 1972 book by Ian Whitcomb
After the Ball (Kirk and Madsen book) (subtitled How America Will Conquer Its Fear and Hatred of Gays in the '90s), a 1989 book by Marshall Kirk and Hunter Madsen
After the Ball (play), a 1997 play by David Williamson
"After the Ball" (short story), a short story by Leo Tolstoy written in 1903

Film and TV
 After the Ball (1897 film), a short French film directed by Georges Méliès
 After the Ball (1910 film), an American film directed by Frank Powell and starring Eddie Dillon and William J. Butler
 After the Ball (1914 film), an American drama starring Effie Shannon and Herbert Kelcey
 After the Ball (1924 film), an American film directed by Dallas M. Fitzgerald and starring Gaston Glass and Miriam Cooper
 After the Ball (1932 film), a British comedy starring Esther Ralston and Basil Rathbone
 After the Ball (1956 film), a Woody Woodpecker short cartoon
 After the Ball (1957 film), a British biography of Vesta Tilley, starring Pat Kirkwood and Laurence Harvey
 After the Ball (1961 film), a Soviet short film based on eponymous short story by Leo Tolstoy
 After the Ball (2015 film), a Canadian romantic comedy-drama starring Portia Doubleday

Music
"After the Ball" (song), a popular music-hall song written in 1891 by Charles K. Harris
"After the Ball", a self-composed song by Johnny Cash from his 1977 album The Rambler
"After the Ball", a self-composed instrumental by Rick Wakeman from his 1977 soundtrack album White Rock
After the Ball (musical), a British 1954 stage musical by Noël Coward
After the Ball (album), a 1973 album by acoustic guitarist John Fahey
After the Ball (subtitled A Treasury of Turn-of-the-Century Popular Songs), a 1974 album by Joan Morris and William Bolcom